The economy of Iran is a mixed economy with a large state-owned sector and is one of the largest in the Middle East. It is the world's 21st largest by purchasing power parity (PPP). Some 60% of Iran's economy is centrally planned. It is dominated by oil and gas production, although over 40 industries are directly involved in the Tehran Stock Exchange. The stock exchange has been one of the best performing exchanges in the world over the past decade. With 10% of the world's proven oil reserves and 15% of its gas reserves, Iran is considered an "energy superpower".

A unique feature of Iran's economy is the presence of large religious foundations called bonyads, whose combined budgets represent more than 30 percent of central government spending.

Price controls and subsidies, particularly on food and energy, are heavily prominent in the economy. Contraband, administrative controls, widespread corruption, and other restrictive factors undermine private sector-led growth. The government's 20-year vision (as of 2020), involves market-based reforms reflected in the government's, with a five year development plan (FY 2016 to FY 2021) focusing on "a resilient economy" and "progress in science and technology". Most of the country's exports are oil and gas, accounting for a majority of government revenue in 2010. However in March 2022, the Iranian parliament under new president Ebrahim Raisi decided to eliminate a major subsidy for importing food, medicines and animal feed, valued at $15 billion in FY2021. Also in March 2022, 20 billion tons of basic goods exports from Russia including vegetable oil, wheat, barley and corn were agreed.

Iran's educated population, high human development, constrained economy and insufficient foreign and domestic investment prompted an increasing number of Iranians to seek overseas employment, resulting in a significant "brain drain". However, in 2015, Iran and the P5+1 reached a deal on the nuclear program which removed most international sanctions. Consequently, for a short period, the tourism industry was significantly improved and the inflation of the country was decreased though US withdrawal from the JCPOA in 2018 hindered the growth of the economy again and increased inflation.

GDP contracted in 2018 and 2019, but a modest rebound was expected in 2020. Challenges include a COVID-19 outbreak starting in February 2020 and US sanctions reimposed in mid-2018, increased unemployment due to the sanctions, inflation, a "chronically weak and undercapitalised" banking system, and an "anemic" private sector. Iran's currency (Iranian rial) has fallen, and Iran has a relatively low rating in "Economic Freedom", and "ease of doing business".

History 

In 546 BC, Croesus of Lydia was defeated and captured by the Persians, who then adopted gold as the main metal for their coins. There are accounts in the biblical Book of Esther of dispatches being sent from Susa to provinces as far out as India and the Kingdom of Kush during the reign of Xerxes the Great (485–465 BC). By the time of Herodotus (c. 475 BC), the Royal Road of the Persian Empire ran some 2,857 km from the city of Susa on the Karun (250 km east of the Tigris) to the port of Smyrna (modern İzmir in Turkey) on the Aegean Sea.

Modern agriculture in Iran dates back to the 1850s when Amir Kabir undertook a number of changes to the traditional agricultural system. Such changes included importing modified seeds and signing collaboration contracts with other countries. Polyakov's Bank Esteqrazi was bought in 1898 by the Tzarist government of Russia, and later passed into the hands of the Iranian government by a contract in 1920. The bank continued its activities under the name of Bank Iran until 1933 when incorporating the newly founded Keshavarzi Bank.

The Imperial Bank of Persia was established in 1885, with offices in all major cities of Persia. Reza Shah Pahlavi (r. 1925–41) improved the country's overall infrastructure, implemented educational reform, campaigned against foreign influence, reformed the legal system, and introduced modern industries. During this time, Iran experienced a period of social change, economic development, and relative political stability.

Reza Shah Pahlavi, who abdicated in 1941, was succeeded by his son, Mohammad Reza Shah Pahlavi (r. 1941–79). No fundamental change occurred in the economy of Iran during World War II (1939–45) and the years immediately following. However, between 1954 and 1960 a rapid increase in oil revenues and sustained foreign aid led to greater investment and fast-paced economic growth, primarily in the government sector. Subsequently, inflation increased, the value of the national currency (the rial) depreciated, and a foreign-trade deficit developed. Economic policies implemented to combat these problems led to declines in the rates of nominal economic growth and per capita income by 1961.

Prior to 1979, Iran developed rapidly. Traditionally agricultural, by the 1970s, the country had undergone significant industrialization and modernization. The pace slowed by 1978 as capital flight reached $30 to $40 billion 1980-US dollars just before the revolution.

Following the nationalizations in 1979 and the outbreak of the Iran–Iraq War, over 80% of the economy came under government control. The eight-year war with Iraq claimed at least 300,000 Iranian lives and injured more than 500,000. The cost of the war to the country's economy was some $500 billion.

After hostilities ceased in 1988, the government tried to develop the country's communication, transportation, manufacturing, health care, education and energy sectors (including its prospective nuclear power facilities), and began integrating its communication and transportation systems with those of neighboring states.

The government's long-term objectives since the revolution were stated as economic independence, full employment, and a comfortable standard of living but Iran's population more than doubled between 1980 and 2000 and its median age declined. Although many Iranians are farmers, agricultural production has consistently fallen since the 1960s. By the late 1990s, Iran imported much of its food. At that time, economic hardship in the countryside resulted in many people moving to cities.

Macroeconomic trends 

The following table shows the main economic indicators in 1980–2021 (with IMF staff estimates in 2022–2027). Inflation below 10% is in green.

Iran's national science budget in 2005 was about $900 million, roughly equivalent to the 1990 figure. By early 2000, Iran allocated around 0.4% of its GDP to research and development, ranking the country behind the world average of 1.4%. In 2009 the ratio of research to GDP was 0.87% against the government's medium-term target of 2.5%. Iran ranked first in scientific growth in the world in 2011 and 17th in science production in 2012.

Iran has a broad and diversified industrial base. According to The Economist, Iran ranked 39th in a list of industrialized nations, producing $23 billion of industrial products in 2008. Between 2008 and 2009 Iran moved to 28th from 69th place in annual industrial production growth because of its relative isolation from the 2008 international financial crisis.

In the early 21st century, the service sector was the country's largest, followed by industry (mining and manufacturing) and agriculture. In 2008 GDP was estimated at $382.3 billion ($842 billion PPP), or $5,470 per capita ($12,800 PPP).

In 2010, the nominal GDP was projected to double in the next five years. However, real GDP growth was expected to average 2.2% a year in 2012–16, insufficient to reduce the unemployment rate. Furthermore, international sanctions have damaged the economy by reducing oil exports by half before recovering in 2016. The Iranian rial lost more than half of its value in 2012, directing Iran at an import substitution industrialization and a resistive economy. According to the International Monetary Fund, Iran is a "transition economy", i.e., changing from a planned to a market economy.

The United Nations classifies Iran's economy as semi-developed. In 2014, Iran ranked 83rd in the World Economic Forum's analysis of the global competitiveness of 144 countries. Political, policy and currency stability are regarded as the most problematic factors in doing business in Iran. Difficulty in accessing financing is also a major concern, especially for small and medium enterprises. Most of Iran's financial resources are directed at trading, smuggling and speculation instead of production and manufacturing. According to Goldman Sachs, Iran has the potential to become one of the world's largest economies in the 21st century. Iranian President Hassan Rouhani stated, in 2014, that the country has the potential to become one of the ten largest economies within the next 30 years.

One major problem often cited by Iranian industrialists is that the government is not supporting them by authorizing imports of similar parts or products into the country, thus undermining their activity and domestic market. This is partly due to corrupt interests inside the government and mismanagement.

Reform plan 

Expansion of public healthcare and international relations are the other main objectives of the fifth plan, an ambitious series of measures that include subsidy reform, banking recapitalization, currency, taxation, customs, construction, employment, nationwide goods and services distribution, social justice and productivity. The intent is to make the country self-sufficient by 2015 and replace the payment of $100 billion in subsidies annually with targeted social assistance. These reforms target the country's major sources of inefficiency and price distortion and are likely to lead to major restructuring of almost all economic sectors. As such, by removing energy subsidies, Iran intends to make its industries more efficient and competitive. By 2016, one third of Iran's economic growth is expected to originate from productivity improvement. Energy subsidies left the country one of the world's least energy-efficient, with energy intensity three times the global average and 2.5 times higher than the Middle Eastern average. Notwithstanding its own issues, the banking sector is seen as a potential hedge against the removal of subsidies, as the plan is not expected to directly impact banks.

National planning 

Iran's budget is established by the Management and Planning Organization of Iran and proposed by the government to the parliament before the year's end. Following approval of the budget by Majlis, the central bank presents a detailed monetary and credit policy to the Money and Credit Council (MCC) for approval. Thereafter, major elements of these policies are incorporated into the five-year economic development plan. The plan is part of "Vision 2025", a strategy for long-term sustainable growth.

Sixth development plan (2016–2021)
The sixth five-year development plan for the 2016–2021 period places emphasis on "guidelines" rather than "hard targets".  It defines only three priorities: 
 the development of a resilient economy;
 progress in science and technology;
 and the promotion of cultural excellence.

Fiscal and monetary policy 

Since the 1979 revolution, government spending has averaged 59% on social policies, 17% on economic matters, 15% on national defense, and 13% on general affairs. Payments averaged 39% on education, health and social security, 20% on other social programs, 3% on agriculture, 16% on water, power and gas, 5% on manufacturing and mining, 12% on roads and transportation and 5% on other economic affairs. Iran's investment reached 27.7% of GDP in 2009. Between 2002 and 2006, inflation fluctuated around 14%. In 2008, around 55% of government revenue came from oil and natural gas revenue, with 31% from taxes and fees. There are virtually millions of people who do not pay taxes in Iran and hence operate outside the formal economy. The budget for year 2012 was $462 billion, 9% less than 2011. The budget is based on an oil price of $85 per barrel. The value of the US dollar is estimated at IRR 12,260 for the same period. According to the head of the Department of Statistics of Iran, if the rules of budgeting were observed the government could save at least 30 to 35% on its expenses. The central bank's interest rate is 21%, and the inflation rate has climbed to 22% in 2012, 10% higher than in 2011. There is little alignment between fiscal and monetary policy. According to the Central Bank of Iran, the gap between the rich and the poor narrowed because of monthly subsidies but the trend could reverse if high inflation persists.

Iran had an estimated $110 billion in foreign reserves in 2011 and balances its external payments by pricing oil at approximately $75 per barrel. As of 2013, only $30 to $50 billion of those reserves are accessible because of current sanctions. Iranian media has questioned the reason behind Iran's government non-repatriation of its foreign reserves before the imposition of the latest round of sanctions and its failure to convert into gold. As a consequence, the Iranian rial lost more than 40% of its value between December 2011 and April 2012. Iran's external and fiscal accounts reflect falling oil prices in FY 2012, but remain in surplus. The current account was expected to reach a surplus of 2.1% of GDP in FY 2012, and the net fiscal balance (after payments to Iran's National Development Fund) will register a surplus of 0.3% of GDP. In 2013 the external debts stood at $7.2 billion down from $17.3 billion in 2012. Overall fiscal deficit is expected to deteriorate to 2.7% of GDP in FY 2016 from 1.7% in 2015.

Money in circulation reached $700 billion in March 2020 (based on the 2017 pre-devaluation exchange rate), thus furthering the decline of the Iranian rial and rise in inflation.

Challenges
 
The GDP of Iran contracted in FY 2018 and FY 2019 and modest rebound is expected in 2020/2021 according to  an April 2020 World Economic Outlook by the IMF. 
Challenges to the economy include the COVID-19 outbreak starting in February 2020, which on top of US sanctions reimposed in mid-2018 and other factors, led a fall in oil production and are projected to lead to a slow recovery in oil exports. Labor-force participation has risen but unemployment is above 10% as of 2020 and projected to rise in 2021 and 2022. Inflation reached 41.1% in 2019, and is expected to continue "in the coming years" according to the World Bank, but decline into the 34-33% range. In July 2022, the average inflation rate rose 40.5% while the inflation rate for food and beverages alone rose 87%. Iran's banking system is "chronically weak and undercapitalised" according to Nordea Bank Abp, holding billions of dollars of non-performing loans, and the private sector remains "anemic". The unofficial Iranian rial to US dollar exchange rate, which had plateaued at 40,000 to one in 2017, has fallen 120,000 to one as of November 2019. Iran's economy has a relatively low rating in the Heritage Foundation's "Index of Economic Freedom" (164 out of 180); and ease of doing business ranking (127 among 190) according to the World Bank.  Critics have complained that privatization has led not to state owned businesses being taken over by "skilled businesspeople" but by the powerful Islamic Revolutionary Guard Corps "and its associates". In 2020, an Iranian businessperson complained to a foreign journalist (Dexter Filkins) that the uncertainty of "chronic shortages of material and unruly inspectors pushing for bribes" made operating his business very difficult -- "Plan for the next quarter? I can't plan for tomorrow morning."

According to the NIOC, daily consumption of gasoline in Iran has surpassed 85 million liters, i.e., 10 times more than Turkey with almost the same population.

Ownership 

Following the hostilities with Iraq, the Government declared its intention to privatize most industries and to liberalize and decentralize the economy.  Sale of state-owned companies proceeded slowly, mainly due to opposition by a nationalist majority in the parliament. In 2006, most industries, some 70% of the economy, remained state-owned. The majority of heavy industries including steel, petrochemicals, copper, automobiles, and machine tools remained in the public sector, with most light industry privately owned.

Article 44 of the Iranian Constitution declares that the country's economy should consist of state, cooperative, and private based sectors. The state sector includes all large-scale industries, foreign trade, major minerals, banking, insurance, power generation, dams and large-scale irrigation networks, radio and television, post, telegraph and telephone services, aviation, shipping, roads, railroads and the like. These are publicly owned and administered by the State. Cooperative companies and enterprises concerned with production and distribution in urban and rural areas form the basis of the cooperative sector and operated in accordance with Shariah law. As of 2012, 5,923 consumer cooperatives, employed 128,396. Consumer cooperatives have over six million members. Private sector operate in construction, agriculture, animal husbandry, industry, trade, and services that supplement the economic activities of the state and cooperative sectors.

Since Article 44 has never been strictly enforced, the private sector has played a much larger role than that outlined in the constitution. In recent years, the role of this sector has increased. A 2004 constitutional amendment allows 80% of state assets to be privatized. Forty percent of such sales are to be conducted through the "Justice Shares" scheme and the rest through the Tehran Stock Exchange. The government would retain the remaining 20%. In 2005, government assets were estimated at around $120 billion. Some $63 billion of such assets were privatized from 2005 to 2010, reducing the government's direct share of GDP from 80% to 40%. Many companies in Iran remain uncompetitive because of mismanagement over the years, thus making privatization less attractive for potential investors. According to then-President Mahmoud Ahmadinejad, 60% of Iran's wealth is controlled by just 300 people.

Islamic Revolutionary Guard Corps 

The Islamic Revolutionary Guard Corps (IRGC) are thought to control about one third of Iran's economy through subsidiaries and trusts. Estimates by the Los Angeles Times suggest IRGC has ties to over one hundred companies and annual revenue in excess of $12 billion, particularly in construction. The Ministry of Petroleum awarded IRGC billions of dollars in no-bid contracts as well as major infrastructure projects. Tasked with border control, IRGC maintains a monopoly on smuggling, costing Iranian companies billions of dollars each year. Smuggling is encouraged in part by the generous subsidization of domestic goods (including fuel). IRGC also runs the telecommunication company, laser eye-surgery clinics, makes cars, builds bridges and roads and develops oil and gas fields.

Religious foundations 

Welfare programs for the needy are managed by more than 30 public agencies alongside semi-state organizations known as bonyads, together with several private non-governmental organizations. Bonyads are a consortium of over 120 tax-exempt organizations that receive subsidies and religious donations. They answer directly to the Supreme Leader of Iran and control over 20% of GDP. Operating everything from vast soybean and cotton farms to hotels, soft drink, automobile manufacturing, and shipping lines, they are seen as overstaffed, corrupt and generally unprofitable. Bonyad companies also compete with Iran's unprotected private sector, whose firms complain of the difficulty of competing with the subsidized bonyads. Bonyads are not subject to audit or Iran's accounting laws. Setad is a multi-sector business organization, with holdings of 37 companies, and an estimated value of $95 billion. It is under the control of the Supreme Leader, Ali Khamenei, and created from thousands of properties confiscated from Iranians.

Labor force 

After the revolution, the government established a national education system that improved adult literacy rates: as of 2008 85% of the adult population was literate, well ahead of the regional average of 62%. The Human Development Index was 0.749 in 2013, placing Iran in the "high human development" bracket.

Annual economic growth of above 5% is necessary to absorb the 750,000 new labor force entrants each year. Agriculture contributes just 10% to GDP and employs 16% of the labor force. As of 2017 the industrial sector, which includes mining, manufacturing, and construction, contributed 35% of GDP and employed 35% of the labor force. Mineral products, notably petroleum, account for 80% of Iran's export revenues, even though mining employs less than 1% of the labor force. In 2004 the service sector ranked as the largest contributor to GDP (48%) and employed 44% of workers. Women made up 33% of the labor force in 2005. Youth unemployment (aged 15–24) was 29.1% in 2012, resulting in significant brain drain. According to the government, some 40% of the workforce in the public sector are either in excess or incompetent.

Personal income and poverty 

Iran is classed as a middle income country and has made significant progress in provision of health and education services in the period covered by the Millennium Development Goals (MDGs). In 2010, Iran's average monthly income was about $500 (GNI per capita in 2012: $13,000 by PPP). A minimum national wage applies to each sector of activity as defined by the Supreme Labor Council. In 2009 this was about $263 per month ($3,156 per year). The World Bank reported that in 2001, approximately 20% of household consumption was spent on food, 32% on fuel, 12% on health care and 8% on education. Iranians have little debt. Seventy percent of Iranians own their homes.

According to the Statistical Center of Iran, median household income of Iran in the fiscal year of 2018–2019 was 434,905,000 rials (a bit above $3,300), an 18.6% rise from the previous yearlong period of 2017–2018, where median household income was about 366,700,000 rials. Adjusted for purchasing power parity, Iran's 2017–2018 median income was equivalent to about $28,647 (2017 conversion factor, private consumption, LCU). As the average Iranian household size is 3.5, this puts median personal income at around $8,185. While Iran rates relatively well on income, median wealth is very low for its income level (on par with Vietnam or Djibouti), indicating a high level of spending. According to SCI, median household spending in the FY 2018 was 393,227,000 rials, or 90.5% of the median household income of 434,905,000 rials.

After the Revolution, the composition of the middle class in Iran did not change significantly, but its size doubled from about 15% of the population in 1979 to more than 32% in 2000. The official poverty line in Tehran for the year ending March 20, 2008, was $9,612, while the national average poverty line was $4,932. In 2010, Iran's Department of Statistics announced that 10 million Iranians live under the absolute poverty line and 30 million live under the relative poverty line.

Social security 

Although Iran does not offer universal social protection, in 1996, the Iranian Center for Statistics estimated that more than 73% of the Iranian population was covered by social security. Membership of the social security system for all employees is compulsory.

Social security ensures employee protection against unemployment, disease, old age and occupational accidents. In 2003, the government began to consolidate its welfare organizations to eliminate redundancy and inefficiency. In 2003 the minimum standard pension was 50% of the worker's earnings but no less than the minimum wage. Iran spent 22.5% of its 2003 national budget on social welfare programs of which more than 50% covered pension costs. Out of the 15,000 homeless in Iran in 2015, 5,000 were women.

Employees between the age of 18 and 65 years are covered by the social security system with financing shared between the employee (7% of salary), the employer (20–23%) and the state, which in turn supplements the employer contribution up to 3%. Social security applies to self-employed workers, who voluntarily contribute between 12% and 18% of income depending on the protection sought. Civil servants, the regular military, law enforcement agencies, and IRGC have their own pension systems.

Trade unions 

Although Iranian workers have a theoretical right to form labor unions, there is no union system in the country. Ostensible worker representation is provided by the Workers' House, a state-sponsored institution that attempts to challenge some state policies. Guild unions operate locally in most areas, but are limited largely to issuing credentials and licenses. The right to strike is generally not respected by the state. Since 1979 strikes have often been met by police action.

A comprehensive law covers labor relations, including hiring of foreign workers. This provides a broad and inclusive definition of the individuals it covers, recognizing written, oral, temporary and indefinite employment contracts. Considered employee-friendly, the labor law makes it difficult to lay off staff. Employing personnel on consecutive six-month contracts (to avoid paying benefits) is illegal, as is dismissing staff without proof of a serious offense. Labor disputes are settled by a special labor council, which usually rules in favor of the employee.

Sectors

Agriculture and foodstuffs 

Agriculture contributes 9.5% to the gross domestic product and employs 17% of the labor force. About 9% of Iran's land is arable, with the main food-producing areas located in the Caspian region and in northwestern valleys. Some northern and western areas support rain-fed agriculture, while others require irrigation.
Primitive farming methods, overworked and under-fertilized soil, poor seed and water scarcity are the principal obstacles to increased production. About one third of total cultivated land is irrigated. Construction of multipurpose dams and reservoirs along rivers in the Zagros and Alborz mountains have increased the amount of water available for irrigation. Agricultural production is increasing as a result of modernization, mechanization, improvements to crops and livestock as well as land redistribution programs.

Wheat, the most important crop, is grown mainly in the west and northwest. Rice is the major crop in the Caspian region. Other crops include barley, corn, cotton, sugar beets, tea, hemp, tobacco, fruits, potatoes, legumes (beans and lentils), vegetables, fodder plants (alfalfa and clover), almonds, walnuts and spices including cumin and sumac. Iran is the world's largest producer of saffron, pistachios, honey, berberis and berries and the second largest date producer. Meat and dairy products include lamb, goat meat, beef, poultry, milk, eggs, butter, and cheese.

Non-food products include wool, leather, and silk. Forestry products from the northern slopes of the Alborz Mountains are economically important. Tree-cutting is strictly controlled by the government, which also runs a reforestation program. Rivers drain into the Caspian Sea and are fished for salmon, carp, trout, pike, and sturgeon that produce caviar, of which Iran is the largest producer.

Since the 1979 revolution, commercial farming has replaced subsistence farming as the dominant mode of agricultural production. By 1997, the gross value reached $25 billion. Iran is 90% self-sufficient in essential agricultural products, although limited rice production leads to substantial imports. In 2007 Iran reached self-sufficiency in wheat production and for the first time became a net wheat exporter. By 2003, a quarter of Iran's non-oil exports were of agricultural products, including fresh and dried fruits, nuts, animal hides, processed foods, and spices. Iran exported $736 million worth of foodstuffs in 2007 and $1 billion (~600,000 tonnes) in 2010. A total of 12,198 entities are engaged in the Iranian food industry, or 12% of all entities in the industry sector. The sector also employs approximately 328,000 people or 16.1% of the
entire industry sector's workforce.

Manufacturing 

Large-scale factory manufacturing began in the 1920s. During the Iran–Iraq War, Iraq bombed many of Iran's petrochemical plants, damaging the large oil refinery at Abadan bringing production to a halt. Reconstruction began in 1988 and production resumed in 1993. In spite of the war, many small factories sprang up to produce import-substitution goods and materials needed by the military.

Iran's major manufactured products are petrochemicals, steel and copper products. Other important manufactures include automobiles, home and electric appliances, telecommunications equipment, cement and industrial machinery. Iran operates the largest operational population of industrial robots in West Asia. Other products include paper, rubber products, processed foods, leather products and pharmaceuticals. In 2000, textile mills, using domestic cotton and wool such as Tehran Patou and Iran Termeh employed around 400,000 people around Tehran, Isfahan and along the Caspian coast.

A 2003 report by the United Nations Industrial Development Organization regarding small and medium-sized enterprises (SMEs) identified the following impediments to industrial development:
 Lack of monitoring institutions;
 Inefficient banking system;
 Insufficient research & development;
 Shortage of managerial skills;
 Corruption;
 Inefficient taxation;
 Socio-cultural apprehensions;
 Absence of social learning loops;
 Shortcomings in international market awareness necessary for global competition;
 Cumbersome bureaucratic procedures;
 Shortage of skilled labor;
 Lack of intellectual property protection;
 Inadequate social capital, social responsibility and socio-cultural values.

Despite these problems, Iran has progressed in various scientific and technological fields, including petrochemical, pharmaceutical, aerospace, defense, and heavy industry. Even in the face of economic sanctions, Iran is emerging as an industrialized country.

Handicrafts 

Iran has a long tradition of producing artisanal goods including Persian carpets, ceramics, copperware, brassware, glass, leather goods, textiles and wooden artifacts. The country's carpet-weaving tradition dates from pre-Islamic times and remains an important industry contributing substantial amounts to rural incomes. An estimated 1.2 million weavers in Iran produce carpets for domestic and international export markets. More than $500 million worth of hand-woven carpets are exported each year, accounting for 30% of the 2008 world market. Around 5.2 million people work in some 250 handicraft fields and contribute 3% of GDP.

Automobile manufacturing 

As of 2001, 13 public and privately owned automakers within Iran, led by Iran Khodro and Saipa that accounted for 94% of domestic production. Iran Khodro's Paykan, replaced by the Samand in 2005, is the predominant brand. With 61% of the 2001 market, Khodro was the largest player, whilst Saipa contributed 33% that year. Other car manufacturers, such as the Bahman Group, Kerman Motors, Kish Khodro, Raniran, Traktorsazi, Shahab Khodro and others accounted for the remaining 6%. These automakers produce a wide range of vehicles including motorbikes, passenger cars such as Saipa's Tiba, vans, mini trucks, medium-sized trucks, heavy trucks, minibuses, large buses and other heavy automobiles used for commercial and private activities in the country. In 2009 Iran ranked fifth in car production growth after China, Taiwan, Romania and India. Iran was the world's 12th biggest automaker in 2010 and operates a fleet of 11.5 million cars. Iran produced 1,395,421 cars in 2010, including 35,901 commercial vehicles.

Defense industry 

In 2007 the International Institute for Strategic Studies estimated Iran's defense budget at $7.31 billion, equivalent to 2.6% of GDP or $102 per capita, ranking it 25th internationally. The country's defense industry manufactures many types of arms and equipment. Since 1992, Iran's Defense Industries Organization (DIO) has produced its own tanks, armored personnel carriers, guided missiles, radar systems, guided missile destroyers, military vessels, submarines and fighter planes. In 2006 Iran exported weapons to 57 countries, including NATO members, and exports reached $100 million. It has also developed a sophisticated mobile air defense system dubbed as Bavar 373.

Construction and real estate 

Until the early 1950s construction remained in the hands of small domestic companies. Increased income from oil and gas and easy credit triggered a building boom that attracted international construction firms to the country. This growth continued until the mid-1970s when a sharp rise in inflation and a credit squeeze collapsed the boom. The construction industry had revived somewhat by the mid-1980s, although housing shortages and speculation remained serious problems, especially in large urban centers. As of January 2011, the banking sector, particularly Bank Maskan, had loaned up to 102 trillion rials ($10.2 billion) to applicants of Mehr housing scheme. Construction is one of the most important sectors accounting for 20–50% of total private investment in urban areas and was one of the prime investment targets of well-off Iranians.

Annual turnover amounted to $38.4 billion in 2005 and $32.8 billion in 2011. Because of poor construction quality, many buildings need seismic reinforcement or renovation. Iran has a large dam building industry.

Mines and metals 

Mineral production contributed 0.6% of the country's GDP in 2011, a figure that increases to 4% when mining-related industries are included. Gating factors include poor infrastructure, legal barriers, exploration difficulties, and government control over all resources. Iran is ranked among the world's 15 major mineral-rich countries.

Although the petroleum industry provides the majority of revenue, about 75% of all mining sector employees work in mines producing minerals other than oil and natural gas. These include coal, iron ore, copper, lead, zinc, chromium, barite, salt, gypsum, molybdenum, strontium, silica, uranium, and gold, the latter of which is mainly a by-product of the Sar Cheshmeh copper complex operation. The mine at Sar Cheshmeh in Kerman Province is home to the world's second largest store of copper.
Large iron ore deposits exist in central Iran, near Bafq, Yazd and Kerman. The government owns 90% of all mines and related industries and is seeking foreign investment. The sector accounts for 3% of exports.

In 2019, the country was the 2nd largest world producer of gypsum; the 8th largest world producer of molybdenum; the world's 8th largest producer of antimony; the 11th largest world producer of iron ore; the 18th largest world producer of sulfur, in addition to being the 21st largest worldwide producer of salt. It was the 13th largest producer in the world of uranium in 2018.

Iran has recoverable coal reserves of nearly 1.9 billion short tonnes. By mid-2008, the country produced about 1.3 million short tonnes of coal annually and consumed about 1.5 million short tonnes, making it a net importer. The country plans to increase hard-coal production to 5 million tons in 2012 from 2 million tons in November 2008.

The main steel mills are located in Isfahan and Khuzestan. Iran became self-sufficient in steel in 2009. Aluminum and copper production are projected to hit 245,000 and 383,000 tons respectively by March 2009. Cement production reached 65 million tons in 2009, exporting to 40 countries.

Petrochemicals 

Iran manufactures 60–70% of its equipment domestically, including refineries, oil tankers, drilling rigs, offshore platforms, and exploration instruments.

Based on a fertilizer plant in Shiraz, the world's largest ethylene unit, in Asalouyeh, and the completion of other special economic zone projects, Iran's exports in petrochemicals reached $5.5 billion in 2007, $9 billion in 2008 and $7.6 billion during the first ten months of the Iranian calendar year 2010. National Petrochemical Company's output capacity will increase to over 100 million tpa by 2015 from an estimated 50 million tpa in 2010 thus becoming the world' second largest chemical producer globally after Dow Chemical with Iran housing some of the world's largest chemical complexes.

Major refineries located at Abadan (site of its first refinery), Kermanshah and Tehran failed to meet domestic demand for gasoline in 2009. Iran's refining industry requires $15 billion in investment over the period 2007–2012 to become self-sufficient and end gasoline imports. Iran has the fifth cheapest gasoline prices in the world leading to fuel smuggling with neighboring countries.

In November 2019, Iran raised the gasoline prices by 50% and imposed a strict rationing system again (as in 2007). The prices per liter gasoline rose to 15,000 rials, where only 60 liters were permitted to private cars for a month. Besides, oil purchase beyond the limit would cost 30,000 rials per liter. Those prices are still well below target prices set in the subsidy reform plan, however. The policy changes came in effect to the US sanctions, and caused protests across the country. The result of the rationing, a year later, was reduced pollution and wasteful domestic consumption and increase in exports.

Services 

Despite 1990s efforts towards economic liberalization, government spending, including expenditure by quasi-governmental foundations, remains high. Estimates of service sector spending in Iran are regularly more than two-fifths of GDP, much government-related, including military expenditures, government salaries, and social security disbursements. Urbanization contributed to service sector growth. Important service industries include public services (including education), commerce, personal services, professional services and tourism.

The total value of transport and communications is expected to rise to $46 billion in nominal terms by 2013, representing 6.8% of Iran's GDP. Projections based on 1996 employment figures compiled for the International Labour Organization suggest that Iran's transport and communications sector employed 3.4 million people, or 20.5% of the labor force in 2008.

Energy, gas, and petroleum 

Energy
Electricity:
production: 258 billion kWh (2014)
consumption: 218 billion kWh (2014)
exports: 9.7 billion kWh (2014)
imports: 3.8 billion kWh (2014)

Electricity production by source:

fossil fuels: 85.6% (2012)
hydro: 12.4% (2012)
other: 0.8% (2012)
nuclear: 1.2% (2012)

Oil:
production:  (2015)
exports:  (2013)
imports:  (2013)
proved reserves:  (2016)

Natural gas:
production: 174.5 km3 (2014)
consumption: 170.2 km3 (2014)
exports: 9.86 km3 (2014)
imports: 6.886 km3 (2014)
proved reserves: 34,020 km3 (2016)

Iran possesses 10% of the world's proven oil reserves and 15% of its gas reserves. Domestic oil and gas along with hydroelectric power facilities provide power. Energy wastage in Iran amounts to six or seven billion dollars per year, much higher than the international norm. Iran recycles 28% of its used oil and gas, whereas some other countries reprocess up to 60%. In 2008 Iran paid $84 billion in subsidies for oil, gas and electricity. It is the world's third largest consumer of natural gas after United States and Russia. In 2010 Iran completed its first nuclear power plant at Bushehr with Russian assistance.

Iran has been a major oil exporter since 1913. The country's major oil fields lie in the central and southwestern parts of the western Zagros mountains. Oil is also found in northern Iran and in the Persian Gulf. In 1978, Iran was the fourth largest oil producer, OPEC's second largest oil producer and second largest exporter. Following the 1979 revolution the new government reduced production. A further decline in production occurred as result of damage to oil facilities during the Iraq-Iran war. Oil production rose in the late 1980s as pipelines were repaired and new Gulf fields exploited. By 2004, annual oil production reached 1.4 billion barrels producing a net profit of $50 billion. Iranian Central Bank data show a declining trend in the share of Iranian exports from oil-products (FY 2006: 84.9%, 2007/2008: 86.5%, 2008/2009: 85.5%, 2009/2010: 79.8%, FY 2010 (first three quarters): 78.9%). Iranian officials estimate that Iran's annual oil and gas revenues could reach $250 billion by 2015 once current projects come on stream.

Pipelines move oil from the fields to the refineries and to such exporting ports as Abadan, Bandar-e Mashur and Kharg Island. Since 1997, Iran's state-owned oil and gas industry has entered into major exploration and production agreements with foreign consortia. In 2008 the Iranian Oil Bourse (IOB) was inaugurated in Kish Island. The IOB trades petroleum, petrochemicals and gas in various currencies. Trading is primarily in the euro and rial along with other major currencies, not including the US dollar. According to the Petroleum Ministry, Iran plans to invest $500 billion in its oil sector by 2025.

Retail and distribution 

Iran's retail industry consists largely of cooperatives (many of them government-sponsored), and independent retailers operating in bazaars. The bulk of food sales occur at street markets with prices set by the Chief Statistics Bureau. Iran has 438,478 small grocery retailers. These are especially popular in cities other than Tehran where the number of hypermarkets and supermarkets is still very limited. More mini-markets and supermarkets are emerging, mostly independent operations. The biggest chainstores are state-owned Etka, Refah, Shahrvand and Hyperstar Market. Electronic commerce in Iran passed the $1 billion mark in 2009.

In 2012, Iranians spent $77 billion on food, $22 billion on clothes and $18.5 billion on outward tourism. In 2015, overall consumer spending and disposable income are projected at $176.4 billion and $287 billion respectively.

Healthcare and pharma 

The constitution entitles Iranians to basic health care. By 2008, 73% of Iranians were covered by the voluntary national health insurance system. Although over 85% of the population use an insurance system to cover their drug expenses, the government heavily subsidizes pharmaceutical production/importation. The total market value of Iran's health and medical sector was $24 billion in 2002 and was forecast to rise to $50 billion by 2013. In 2006, 55 pharmaceutical companies in Iran produced 96% (quantitatively) of the medicines for a market worth $1.2 billion. This figure is projected to increase to $3.65 billion by 2013.

Tourism and travel 

Although tourism declined significantly during the war with Iraq, it has subsequently recovered. About 1,659,000 foreign tourists visited Iran in 2004 and 2.3 million in 2009 mostly from Asian countries, including the republics of Central Asia, while about 10% came from the European Union and North America.

The most popular tourist destinations are Mazandaran, Isfahan, Mashhad and Shiraz. In the early 2000s the industry faced serious limitations in infrastructure, communications, industry standards and personnel training.  Several organized tours from Germany, France and other European countries come to Iran annually to visit archaeological sites and monuments. In 2003 Iran ranked 68th in tourism revenues worldwide. According to UNESCO and the deputy head of research for Iran Travel and Tourism Organization (ITTO), Iran is rated among the "10 most touristic countries in the world". Domestic tourism in Iran is one of the largest in the world.

Banking, finance and insurance 

Government loans and credits are available to industrial and agricultural projects, primarily through banks. Iran's unit of currency is the rial which had an average official exchange rate of 9,326 rials to the U.S. dollar in 2007. Rials are exchanged on the unofficial market at a higher rate. In 1979, the government nationalized private banks. The restructured banking system replaced interest on loans with handling fees, in accordance with Islamic law. This system took effect in the mid-1980s.

The banking system consists of a central bank, the Bank Markazi, which issues currency and oversees all state and private banks. Several commercial banks have branches throughout the country. Two development banks exist and a housing bank specializes in home mortgages. The government began to privatize the banking sector in 2001 when licenses were issued to two new privately owned banks.

State-owned commercial banks predominantly make loans to the state, bonyad enterprises, large-scale private firms and four thousand wealthy/connected individuals. While most Iranians have difficulty obtaining small home loans, 90 individuals secured facilities totaling $8 billion. In 2009, Iran's General Inspection Office announced that Iranian banks held some $38 billion of delinquent loans, with capital of only $20 billion.

Foreign transactions with Iran amounted to $150 billion of major contracts between 2000 and 2007, including private and government lines of credit. In 2007, Iran had $62 billion in assets abroad. In 2010, Iran attracted almost $11.9 billion from abroad, of which $3.6 billion was FDI, $7.4 billion was from international commercial bank loans, and around $900 million consisted of loans and projects from international development banks.

As of 2010, the Tehran Stock Exchange traded the shares of more than 330 registered companies.  Listed companies were valued at $100 billion in 2011.

Insurance premiums accounted for just under 1% of GDP in 2008, a figure partly attributable to low average income per head. Five state-owned insurance firms dominate the market, four of which are active in commercial insurance. The leading player is the Iran Insurance Company, followed by Asia, Alborz and Dana insurances. In 2001/02 third-party liability insurance accounted for 46% of premiums, followed by health insurance (13%), fire insurance (10%) and life insurance (9.9%).

Communications, electronics and IT 

Broadcast media, including five national radio stations and five national television networks as well as dozens of local radio and television stations are run by the government. In 2008, there were 345 telephone lines and 106 personal computers for every 1,000 residents. Personal computers for home use became more affordable in the mid-1990s, since when demand for Internet access has increased rapidly. As of 2010, Iran also had the world's third largest number of bloggers (2010). In 1998, the Ministry of Post, Telegraph & Telephone (later renamed the Ministry of Information & Communication Technology) began selling Internet accounts to the general public. In 2006, revenues from the Iranian telecom industry were estimated at $1.2 billion. In 2006, Iran had 1,223 Internet Service Providers (ISPs), all private sector operated. As of 2014, Iran has the largest mobile market in the Middle East, with 83.2 million mobile subscriptions and 8 million smart-phones in 2012.

According to the World Bank, Iran's information and communications technology sector had a 1.4% share of GDP in 2008. Around 150,000 people work in this sector, including 20,000 in the software industry. 1,200 IT companies were registered in 2002, 200 in software development. In 2014 software exports stood at $400 million. By the end of 2009, Iran's telecom market was the fourth-largest in the Middle East at $9.2 billion and was expected to reach $12.9 billion by 2014 at a compound annual growth rate of 6.9%.

Transport 

Iran has an extensive paved road system linking most towns and all cities. In 2011, the country had  of roads, of which 73% were paved. In 2007 there were approximately 100 passenger cars for every 1,000 inhabitants.

The country's major port of entry is Bandar-Abbas on the Strait of Hormuz. After arriving in Iran, imported goods are distributed by trucks and freight trains. The Tehran–Bandar-Abbas railroad, opened in 1995, connects Bandar-Abbas to Central Asia via Tehran and Mashhad. Other major ports include Bandar Anzali and Bandar Torkaman on the Caspian Sea and Khoramshahr and Bandar Imam Khomeini on the Persian Gulf. Dozens of cities have passenger and cargo airports. Iran Air, the national airline, was founded in 1962 and operates domestic and international flights. All large cities have bus transit systems and private companies provide intercity bus services. Tehran, Mashhad, Shiraz, Tabriz, Ahvaz and Isfahan are constructing underground railways. More than one million people work in the transportation sector, accounting for 9% of 2008 GDP.

In August 2022, President Ebrahim Raisi’s cabinet approved a law to import fully assembled foreign cars. His predecessor President Hassan Rouhani, had outlawed such imports in July 2018 due to sanctions imposed on Iran. Regular Iranian citizens were unable to buy safe cars at affordable prices.

International trade 

Iran is a founding member of OPEC and the Organization of Gas Exporting Countries. Petroleum constitutes 56% of Iran's exports with a value of $60.2 billion in 2018. For the first time, the value of Iran's non-oil exports is expected to reach the value of imports at $43 billion in 2011. Pistachios, liquefied propane, methanol (methyl alcohol), hand-woven carpets and automobiles are the major non-oil exports. Copper, cement, leather, textiles, fruits, saffron and caviar are also export items of Iran.

Technical and engineering service exports in FY 2007 were $2.7 billion of which 40% of technical services went to Central Asia and the Caucasus, 30% ($350 million) to Iraq, and close to 20% ($205 million) to Africa.
Iranian firms have developed energy, pipelines, irrigation, dams and power generation in different countries. The country has made non-oil exports a priority by expanding its broad industrial base, educated and motivated workforce and favorable location, which gives it proximity to an estimated market of some 300 million people in Caspian, Persian Gulf and some ECO countries further east.

Total import volume rose by 189% from $13.7 billion in 2000 to $39.7 billion in 2005 and $55.189 billion in 2009. Iran's major commercial partners are China, France, Germany, India, Italy, Japan, Russia, and South Korea. From 1950 until 1978, the United States was Iran's foremost economic and military partner, playing a major role in infrastructure and industry modernization. It is reported that around 80% of machinery and equipment in Iran is of German origin. In July 2018, France, Germany and the UK agreed to continue trade with Iran without using Dollar as a medium of exchange. In March 2018, Iran had banned Dollar in trade.

Since the mid-1990s, Iran has increased its economic cooperation with other developing countries in "South–South integration" including Syria, India, China, South Africa, Cuba, and Venezuela. Iran's trade with India passed $13 billion in 2007, an 80% increase within a year. Iran is expanding its trade ties with Turkey and Pakistan and shares with its partners the common objective to create a common market in West and Central Asia through ECO.

Since 2003, Iran has increased investment in neighboring countries such as Iraq and Afghanistan. In Dubai, UAE, it is estimated that Iranian expatriates handle over 20% of its domestic economy and account for an equal proportion of its population. Migrant Iranian workers abroad remitted less than $2 billion home in 2006. Between 2005 and 2009, trade between Dubai and Iran tripled to $12 billion; money invested in the local real estate market and import-export businesses, collectively known as the Bazaar, and geared towards providing Iran and other countries with required consumer goods. It is estimated that one third of Iran's imported goods and exports are delivered through the black market, underground economy, and illegal jetties, thus damaging the economy.

Foreign direct investment 

In the 1990s and early 2000s, indirect oilfield development agreements were made with foreign firms, including buyback contracts in the oil sector whereby the contractor provided project finance in return for an allocated production share. Operation transferred to National Iranian Oil Company (NIOC) after a set number of years, completing the contract.

Unfavorable or complex operating requirements and international sanctions have hindered foreign investment in the country, despite liberalization of relevant regulations in the early 2000s. Iran absorbed $24.3 billion of foreign investment between the Iranian calendar years 1993 and 2007. The EIU estimates that Iran's net FDI will rise by 100% between 2010 and 2014.

Foreign investors concentrated their activities in the energy, vehicle manufacture, copper mining, construction, utilities, petrochemicals, clothing, food and beverages, telecom and pharmaceuticals sectors. Iran is a member of the World Bank's Multilateral Investment Guarantee Agency. In 2006, the combined net worth of Iranian citizens abroad was about 1.3 trillion dollars.

According to the head of the Organization for Investment, Economic and Technical Assistance of Iran (OIETAI), in 2008 Iran ranked 142 among 181 countries in working conditions. Iran stands at number 96 in terms of business start-ups, 165 in obtaining permits, 147 in employment, 147 in asset registration, 84 in obtaining credit, 164 in legal support for investments, 104 in tax payments, 142 in overseas trade, 56 in contract feasibility and 107 in bankruptcy. Firms from over 50 countries invested in Iran between 1992 and 2008, with Asia and Europe the largest participants as shown below:

The economic impact of a partial lifting of sanctions extends beyond the energy sector; The New York Times reported that "consumer-oriented companies, in particular, could find opportunity in this country with 81 million consumers, many of whom are young and prefer Western products". The consumer-goods market is expected to grow by $100 billion by 2020. Iran is considered "a strong emerging market play" by investment and trading firms. Opening Iran's market place to foreign investment could also be a boon to competitive multinational firms operating in a variety of manufacturing and service sectors, worth $600 billion to $800 billion in new investment opportunities over the next decade.

World Trade Organization 

Iran has held observer status at the World Trade Organization (WTO) since 2005. Although the United States has consistently blocked its bid to join the organization, observer status came in a goodwill gesture to ease nuclear negotiations between Iran and the international community. With exports of 60 products with revealed comparative advantage, Iran is the 65th "most complex country".

Should Iran eventually gain membership status in the WTO, among other prerequisites, copyrights will have to be enforced in the country. This will require a major overhaul. The country is hoping to attract billions of dollars' worth of foreign investment by creating a more favorable investment climate through freer trade. Free trade zones such as Qeshm, Chabahar, and Kish Island are expected to assist in this process. Iran allocated $20 billion in 2010 to loans for the launch of twenty trade centers in other countries.

International sanctions 
See also Economic Recession in Iran

After the Iranian Revolution in 1979, the United States ended its economic and diplomatic ties with Iran, banned Iranian oil imports and froze approximately $11 billion of its assets. In 1996, the U.S. Government passed the Iran and Libya Sanctions Act (ILSA) which prohibits U.S. (and non-U.S.) companies from investing and trading with Iran in amounts of more than $20 million annually. Since 2000 exceptions to this restriction have been made for items including pharmaceuticals and medical equipment.

Iran's nuclear program has been the subject of contention with the West since 2006 over suspicions of its intentions. The UN Security Council imposed sanctions against select companies linked to the nuclear program, thus furthering the country's economic isolation. The economic effects of sanctions have been severe. Sanctions notably bar nuclear, missile and many military exports to Iran and target investments in oil, gas and petrochemicals, exports of refined petroleum products, as well as the Islamic Revolutionary Guard Corps, banks, insurance, financial transactions and shipping. In 2012 the European Union tightened its own sanctions by joining the three decade-old US oil embargo against Iran. In 2015, Iran and the P5+1 reached a deal on the nuclear program that will remove the main sanctions by early 2016. Even though Iran can trade in its own currency some problems subsist mainly due to the fact that it cannot transact in US dollars freely. 

In 2018, the United States government unilaterally withdrew from the JCPOA agreement and re-imposed its sanctions on Iran's oil sales, petrochemicals, shipping, metals trading and banking transactions.

Effects 

According to U.S. Undersecretary of State William J. Burns, Iran may be losing as much as $60 billion annually in energy investment. Sanctions are making imports 24% more costly on average. In addition, the latest round of sanctions could cost Iran annually $50 billion in lost oil revenues. Iran is increasingly using barter trade because its access to the international dollar payment system has been denied. According to Iranian officials, large-scale withdrawal by international companies represents an "opportunity" for domestic companies to replace them.

The IEA estimated that Iranian exports fell to a record of 860,000 bpd in September 2012 from 2.2 million bpd at the end of 2011. This fall led to a drop in revenues and clashes on the streets of Tehran when the local currency, the rial, collapsed. September 2012 output was Iran's lowest since 1988.

According to the U.S. Iran could reduce the world price of crude petroleum by 10%, saving the United States annually $76 billion (at the proximate 2008 world oil price of $100/bbl).

According to NIAC, sanctions cost the United States over $175 billion in lost trade and 279,000 lost job opportunities. Between 2010 and 2012, sanctions cost the E.U. states more than twice as much as the United States in terms of lost trade revenue. Germany was hit the hardest, losing between $23.1 and $73.0 billion between 2010–2012, with Italy and France following at $13.6-$42.8 billion and $10.9-$34.2 billion respectively.

GDP growth turned negative in 2013 (−5%). The unofficial unemployment rate was 20% by mid-2012. Oil exports dropped to 1.4 million bpd in 2014 from 2.5 million bpd in 2011. By 2013, Iran had $80 billion in foreign exchange reserves frozen overseas. Automobile production declined 40% between 2011 and 2013. According to the U.S. government in 2015, Iran's economy has reached a point where it is "fundamentally incapable of recovery" without a nuclear accommodation with the West.

The tentative rapprochement between Iran and the US, which began in the second half of 2013, has the potential to become a world-changing development, and unleash tremendous geopolitical and economic opportunities, if it is sustained […] if Iran and the US were to achieve a diplomatic breakthrough, geopolitical tensions in the Middle East could decline sharply, and Iran could come to be perceived as a promising emerging market in its own right.

In January 2019, President Hassan Rouhani blamed the US for Iran's declining economy. Following the US pullout from an international nuclear deal with Iran and re-imposed sanctions, Iran faced the toughest economic situation in 40 years. According to Majlis, this has caused damages estimated between 150 and 200 billion dollars to the Iranian economy.

See also 

 Corruption in Iran
 Electronic currency in Iran
 Virtual currency law in Iran
 Energy superpower
 Foreign relations of Iran
 Iranian calendar
 Iran's international rankings in economy
 Iranian targeted subsidy plan
 Smuggling in Iran
 Venture capital in Iran

Lists
 List of Iranians by net worth
 List of Iranian companies
 List of Iranian economists
 List of major economic laws in Iran

Institutions
 Donya-e-Eqtesad leading Iranian business newspaper
 Government of Iran with links to ministries and affiliated agencies
 International Iranian Economic Association
 Iran Chamber of Commerce Industries and Mines with links to information on commercial dispute resolution
 Ministry of Economic Affairs and Finance (Iran)
 Iranian National Tax Administration
 Ministry of Industries and Business (Iran) merger of Ministry of Commerce with Ministry of Industries and Mines
 Ministry of Petroleum (Iran)
 National Development Fund Iran's sovereign wealth fund
 Ravand Institute Iran's "Davos Forum"
 Supreme Audit Court of Iran

Notes

General references 

Encyclopedia Iranica entries

 
 
 

Articles

 
 
 
 
 
 
 
 
 
 
 
 
 
 
 
 
 

Books

 
 
 
 
 
 
 
 
 
 
 
 

Governments

 
 
 
 
 
 
 
 
 
 

Papers

External links 

General
 BBC Iran in Maps (Population, land and infrastructure)
 DMOZ  Business and Economy of Iran (Open Directory)
 Financial Tribune Iran's economic and business newspaper (in English)
 Pars Times Iran Business Resources (Comprehensive list of resources on the Internet relating to Iran and its economy)

 Governments
 Ministry of Economic Affairs and Finance Of Iran  Official Website
 Ministry of Industry, Mine & Trade of Iran  Official Website
 Central Bank of Iran  Detailed statistics about Iran's economy and sectors, including national accounts and annual reviews
 High Council of Iran Free Trade-Industrial Zone  Official site with information on Iran's Free Trade Zones
 Organization For Investment, Economic and Technical Assistance of Iran  Government "one-stop institution" for foreign direct investment in Iran (Including information on labor laws, taxation and customs)
 Trade Promotion Organization of Iran  Many useful information about trade, FDI, economic reports, customs, laws, statistics, links and opportunities for investors in Iran (Affiliated to Iran's Ministry of Commerce)
 Austrade Iran Profile (Many practical information and sector specific reports, with useful websites and resources. Login required for sector reports)
U.K. Department for International Trade Doing business in Iran (Trade and export guide)
 U.S. Central Intelligence Agency: Iran's entry The World Factbook
 U.S. Department of Energy: Iran's entry Oil, gas, electricity, data, profile, analysis and resources

 Publications and statistics
 American Enterprise Institute Global Investment in Iran (Indicative list of major international companies investing in Iran broken down by their nationality, sector of activity and amount invested)
 Business Monitor International Iran Business Forecast Report (Login required for sector reports)
 Business Year – Iran (VIP interviews, economic data, sector reports, investment opportunities)
 Economist Intelligence Unit: Iran's entry Forecast, factsheet, regulation, economic data & structure (Login required for some reports)
 International Monetary Fund Analysis, reports and recommendations for Iran
 Statistical Center of Iran Statistics by topic, database and metadata
 Turquoise Partners Iran Investment Monthly (Reports on the Tehran Stock Exchange and Iran's economy)
 World Bank Social and economic indicators for Iran

 
Iran